Tylodina fungina is a species of sea snail or false limpet, a marine opisthobranch gastropod mollusk in the family Tylodinidae.

Ecology
Tylodina fungina feeds only on Aplysina gerardogreeni according to the in situ observations on the Pacific coast of Mexico. It is specialized on this sponge.

References

External links

Tylodinidae
Gastropods described in 1865